Rough Creek is a stream in the U.S. state of Georgia. It is a tributary to the Conasauga River.

Rough Creek was so named on account of the uneven terrain near its course.

References

Rivers of Georgia (U.S. state)
Rivers of Murray County, Georgia